For information on all Niagara University sports, see Niagara Purple Eagles

The Niagara Purple Eagles men's basketball team is the college basketball team that represents Niagara University in Lewiston, New York, United States. The school's team currently competes in the Metro Atlantic Athletic Conference. The team formerly played at the now-defunct Niagara Falls Convention and Civic Center from 1973 to 1982 and from 1988 to 1996.

History
Niagara has played in the NCAA Tournament three times. They last played in the NCAA Division I men's basketball tournament in 2007. They played in the National Invitation Tournament on 14 occasions, advancing to the championship game in 1972 before losing to Maryland. Niagara has been ranked in the AP Final Polls twice, 16th in 1954 and 17th in 1970.

Roster

Postseason

NCAA tournament results
The Purple Eagles have appeared in three NCAA Tournaments. Their combined record is 2–4.

NIT results
The Purple Eagles have appeared in 14 National Invitation Tournaments. Their combined record is 9–14.

CIT results
The Purple Eagles made their first appearance in the CollegeInsider.com Postseason Tournament (CIT) in 2018. Their record is 0–1.

All time MAAC Awards 

*Up to 2021-22 season

Seasons

Niagara wins vs. the AP Top 25

Retired jerseys
Niagara has retired nine jerseys.

Head coaches

*-Beilein was hired in March 2019 but resigned in October 2019 without having coached a game; Paulus was named interim head coach in his place.

Purple Eagles in the NBA or National leagues

Joe Arlauckas
Al Butler
 T. J. Cline (born 1994), American-Israeli basketball player
Larry Costello
Boo Ellis
Bo Erias
Ed Fleming
Manny Leaks
Juan Mendez
Calvin Murphy
Zeke Sinicola
Joe Smyth
 Chris Watson (born 1975), American-Israeli basketball player in the Israeli Premier League. In the Niagara University Hall of Fame.
Andy Walker

References

External links